Haplogroup K, formerly Haplogroup UK, is a human mitochondrial DNA (mtDNA) haplogroup. It is defined by the HVR1 mutations 16224C and 16311C. It is now known that K is a subclade of U8.

Origin
Haplogroup K is believed to have originated in the mid-Upper Paleolithic, between about 30,000 and 22,000 years ago. It is the most common subclade of haplogroup U8b.

Distribution

Haplogroup K appears in Central Europe, Southern Europe, Northern Europe, North Africa, the Horn of Africa, South Asia and West Asia and in populations with such an ancestry. Overall the mtDNA haplogroup K is found in about 6% of the population of Europe and the Near East, but it is more common in certain populations. 

Approximately 32% of people with Ashkenazi Jewish ancestry are in haplogroup K, with about 21% in K1a1b1a alone. This high percentage points to a genetic bottleneck occurring around the years 800-1000 under which K1a1b1a was particularly affected since K1a1b1a carriers' proportions of founder alleles and pathogenic variants were higher than in carriers of other haplogroups and the K1a1b1a carriers had longer total lengths for runs of homozygosity compared to carriers of other haplogroups. Ashkenazi mtDNA K clusters into six subclades: K1a1b1*, K1a1b1a, K1a4a, K1a9, K2a*, and K2a2a1. Several of these have Middle Eastern origins. A 2013 study had suggested that K1a1b1a, K1a9, and K2a2a1 could have originated from Western Europe. However, K1a9 is shared with non-Jews in Syria and Iran and K2a2a is shared with Mizrahi Jews from the Caucasus and Muslims on the Arabian Peninsula although K2a2a1 is also in Italy and the Iberian Peninsula. K1a4a is found in Syria and Turkey but also found in non-Jewish Europeans, including Greeks and Italians. Some of these kinds of matches to K haplogroups could support the contention that some of these individual female ancestors came from a Hebrew/Levantine mtDNA pool, whose descendants lived in Europe.

In Europe, K appears to be most common in the Morbihan (17.5%) and Périgord-Limousin (15.3%) regions of France, and in Norway and Bulgaria (13.3%). The level is 12.5% in Belgium, 11% in Georgia and 10% in Austria and Great Britain. Some specific subclades of K among Europeans are K1a1b2b in Finland, K1a3a1 in Sardinia, K1a19 in Hungary, K1b1b1a in Greeks, K1b1c in Serbia, Slovakia, and Poland, K1c2 in Irish and Germans and in Hungary, and K2a9a in Sardinia.

Approximately 16% of the Druze of Syria, Lebanon, Israel, and Jordan, belong to haplogroup K. Examples of Druze branches of K are K1a5a and K1a17a. It is also found among 8% of Palestinians. Additionally, K reaches a level of 17% in Kurdistan.

Haplogroup K is also found among Gurage (10%), Syrians (9.1%), Afar (6.3%), Zenata Berbers (4.11%), Reguibate Sahrawi (3.70%), Oromo (3.3%), Iraqis (2.4%), Saudis (0%-10.5%), Yemenis (0%-9.8%), and Algerians (0%-4.3%).

Derenko et al. (2007) found haplogroup K in many samples of Iranic, Turkic, Mongolic, and Tungusic peoples of central Eurasia, including 6.8% (3/44) of a sample of Tajiks, 6.7% (6/90) of a sample of Altai Kizhi, 3.7% (3/82) of a sample of Persians, 2.7% (2/73) of a sample of West Evenks from the Krasnoyarsk region, 2.7% (3/110) of a sample of Kalmyks, 2.1% (1/47) of a sample of Mongolians, 2.0% (2/99) of a sample of Khamnigans, 1.9% (1/53) of a sample of Teleuts, 1.4% (4/295) of a sample of Buryats, and 1.2% (1/82) of a sample of Shors. Min-Sheng Peng et al. found haplogroup K1 in 10.3% (7/68) of a sample of Kyrgyz from Taxkorgan, 7.6% (5/66) of a sample of Wakhi from Taxkorgan, 5.8% (5/86) of a sample of Sarikoli from Taxkorgan, 3.7% (1/27) of a sample of Uyghur from Artux, and 2.0% (1/50) of a sample of Pamiri from Gorno-Badakhshan. In eastern China, mtDNA haplogroup K has been found in 1.3% (1/149 K1a13, 1/149 K2a5) of a sample of Barga Mongols in Hulunbuir and in 0.9% of a sample of Beijing Han.

Ancient DNA
The more ancient evidence of Haplogroup K has been found in the remains of three individuals from Upper Palaeolithic Magdalenian of Spain with 11950 years and in the Pre-Pottery Neolithic B site of Tell Ramad, Syria, dating from c. 6000 BC. The clade was also discovered in skeletons of early farmers in Central Europe dated to around 5500-5300 BC, at percentages that were nearly double the percentage present in modern Europe. Some techniques of farming, together with associated plant and animal breeds, spread into Europe from the Near East. The evidence from ancient DNA suggests that the Neolithic culture spread by human migration.

Analysis of the mtDNA of Ötzi, the frozen mummy from 3300 BC found on the Austrian-Italian border, has shown that Ötzi belongs to the K1 subclade. It cannot be categorized into any of the three modern branches of that subclade (K1a, K1b or K1c). The new subclade has provisionally been named K1ö for Ötzi. Multiplex assay study was able to confirm that the Iceman's mtDNA belongs to a new European mtDNA clade with a very limited distribution amongst modern data sets.

A woman buried some time between 2650 and 2450 BC in a presumed Amorite tomb at Terqa (Tell Ashara), Middle Euphrates Valley, Syria carried Haplogroup K.

A lock of hair kept at a reliquary at Saint-Maximin-la-Sainte Baume basilica, France, which local tradition holds belonged to the biblical figure Mary Magdalene, was also assigned to haplogroup K. Ancient DNA sequencing of a capillary bulb bore the K1a1b1a subclade and according to the highly controversial researcher , who claims to have discovered the DNA of Jesus Christ, it would indicate that she would have been of Pharisian maternal origin.

Haplogroup K1 has likewise been observed among specimens at the mainland cemetery in Kulubnarti, Sudan, which date from the Early Christian period (AD 550-800).

In 2016, researchers extracted the DNA from the tibia of two individuals separately dated to 7288-6771 BCE and 7605-7529 BCE buried in Theopetra cave, Greece, the oldest known human-made structure, and both individuals were found to belong to mtDNA Haplogroup K1c.

Thuya, the great-grandmother of Tutankhamun passed haplogroup K to her descendants, including that king. Haplogroup K has also been observed among ancient Egyptian mummies excavated at the Abusir el-Meleq archaeological site in Middle Egypt, which date from the Pre-Ptolemaic/late New Kingdom and Roman periods. Fossils excavated at the Late Neolithic site of Kelif el Boroud in Morocco, which have been dated to around 3,000 BCE, have likewise been observed to carry the K1 subclade.

Subclades

Tree
This phylogenetic tree of haplogroup K subclades is based on the paper by Mannis van Oven and Manfred Kayser Updated comprehensive phylogenetic tree of global human mitochondrial DNA variation and subsequent published research.

Genetic traits 
A study involving Caucasian patients showed that individuals classified as haplogroup J or K demonstrated a significant decrease in risk of Parkinson's disease versus individuals carrying the most common haplogroup, H.

In popular culture

In his popular book The Seven Daughters of Eve, Bryan Sykes named the originator of this mtDNA haplogroup Katrine.

On an 18 November 2005 broadcast of the Today Show, during an interview with Dr. Spencer Wells of The National Geographic Genographic Project, host Katie Couric was revealed to belong to haplogroup K.

On 14 August 2007, Stephen Colbert was told by geneticist Spencer Wells that he is a member of this haplogroup during a segment on The Colbert Report.

Henry Louis Gates Jr. states that Meryl Streep belongs to Haplogroup K in his book Faces of America.

See also

Genealogical DNA test
Genetic genealogy
Haplogroup K1a1b1a (mtDNA)
Human mitochondrial genetics
Population genetics
Human mitochondrial DNA haplogroup

References

External links
General
Mannis van Oven's Phylotree
Haplogroup K
Spread of Haplogroup K, from National Geographic
Eupedia Haplogroup K page
mtDNA Haplogroup K Project at Family Tree DNA
Danish Demes Regional DNA Project: mtDNA Haplogroup K
Ian Logan's Mitochondrial DNA Site

K
Ashkenazi Jews topics